In September 2016, the International Union for Conservation of Nature (IUCN) listed 1245 vulnerable fish species. Of all evaluated fish species, 8.1% are listed as vulnerable. 
The IUCN also lists eight fish subspecies as vulnerable.

Of the subpopulations of fishes evaluated by the IUCN, 18 species subpopulations have been assessed as vulnerable.

For a species to be assessed as vulnerable to extinction the best available evidence must meet quantitative criteria set by the IUCN designed to reflect "a high risk of extinction in the wild". Endangered and critically endangered species also meet the quantitative criteria of vulnerable species, and are listed separately. See: List of endangered fishes, List of critically endangered fishes. Vulnerable, endangered and critically endangered species are collectively referred to as threatened species by the IUCN.

Additionally 3191 fish species (21% of those evaluated) are listed as data deficient, meaning there is insufficient information for a full assessment of conservation status. As these species typically have small distributions and/or populations, they are intrinsically likely to be threatened, according to the IUCN. While the category of data deficient indicates that no assessment of extinction risk has been made for the taxa, the IUCN notes that it may be appropriate to give them "the same degree of attention as threatened taxa, at least until their status can be assessed."

This is a complete list of vulnerable fish species and subspecies evaluated by the IUCN. Species and subspecies which have vulnerable subpopulations (or stocks) are indicated.

Lobe-finned fishes
Indonesian coelacanth (Latimeria menadoensis)

Cartilaginous fishes
Chondrichthyes includes sharks, rays, skates, and sawfish. There are 121 species and eight subpopulations of cartilaginous fish assessed as vulnerable.

Angelsharks

Mackerel sharks
Species

Subpopulations
Shortfin mako shark (Isurus oxyrinchus) (2 subpopulations)

Rays and skates
There are 74 species and one subpopulation in the order Rajiformes assessed as vulnerable.

Rhynchobatids

Guitarfish species

Whiptail stingrays

Narcinids
Species

Subpopulations
Apron ray (Discopyge tschudii) (1 subpopulation)

Skates

Skates

Other Rajiformes species

Ground sharks
Species

Subpopulations

Carpet sharks

Squaliformes
Species

Subpopulations
Spiny dogfish (Squalus acanthias) (2 subpopulations)

Chimaeras
Ogilby's ghostshark (Hydrolagus ogilbyi)

Lampreys

Ray-finned fishes
There are 1114 species, eight subspecies, and four subpopulations of ray-finned fish assessed as vulnerable.

Acipenseriformes

Species

Subspecies
Gulf sturgeon (Acipenser oxyrinchus desotoi)

Salmoniformes
Species

Subpopulations
Sockeye salmon (Oncorhynchus nerka) (3 subpopulations)

Silversides

Toothcarps
There are 85 species and three subspecies of toothcarp assessed as vulnerable.

Goodeids

Pupfish species

Aplocheilids
Pachypanchax arnoulti
Pachypanchax patriciae

Rivulids

Nothobranchiids
Species

Subspecies

Poeciliids

Fundulids

Cypriniformes
Cypriniformes includes carps, minnows, loaches and relatives. There are 298 species and one subspecies in the order Cypriniformes assessed as vulnerable.

Hillstream loaches

True loaches

Cyprinids
Species

Subspecies
Incilevrek baligi (Phoxinellus zeregi fahirae)

Suckers

Gasterosteiformes

Species

Subpopulations
Little dragonfish (Eurypegasus draconis) (1 subpopulation)
Longtail seamoth (Pegasus volitans) (2 subpopulations)

Osmeriformes

Catfishes
There are 89 catfish species assessed as vulnerable.

Ictalurids

Sisorids

Loach catfishes

Claroteids

Airbreathing catfishes

Loricariids

Mochokids

Bagrids

Other catfish species

Batrachoidiformes

Perciformes
There are 405 species, one subspecies, and one subpopulation in the order Perciformes assessed as vulnerable.

Gouramis

Cichlids
Species

Subspecies
Sarotherodon galilaeus borkuanus

Percids

Epinephelids
Species

Subpopulations

Gobies

Sparids

Sand stargazers

Sciaenids

Labrisomids

Serranids

Chaenopsids

Combtooth blennies

Wrasses

Threefin blennies

Other Perciformes species

Beloniformes

Synbranchiformes

Osteoglossiformes

Mormyrids

Gobiesociformes

Characiformes
Species

Subspecies
Astyanax mexicanus jordani

Syngnathiformes

Clupeiformes
Species

Subspecies
Clupeonella abrau muhlisi

Scorpaeniformes

Ophidiiformes

Tetraodontiformes

Other ray-finned fish species

Hagfishes

See also 
 Lists of IUCN Red List vulnerable species
 List of least concern fishes
 List of near threatened fishes
 List of endangered fishes
 List of critically endangered fishes
 List of recently extinct fishes
 List of data deficient fishes
 Sustainable seafood advisory lists and certification

References 

 01
Vulnerable
Fish
Vulnerable
Vulnerable fishes